The 1961 Buddy Shuman 250 was a NASCAR Grand National Series event that was held on September 8, 1961, at Hickory Speedway in Hickory, North Carolina.

Background
Hickory Motor Speedway is a short track located in Hickory, North Carolina.  It is one of stock car racing's most storied venues, and is often referred to as the "World's Most Famous Short Track" and the "Birthplace of the NASCAR Stars".

The track first opened in 1951 as a  dirt track.  Gwyn Staley won the first race at the speedway and later became the first track champion.  Drivers such as Junior Johnson, Ned Jarrett, and Ralph Earnhardt also became track champions in the 1950s, with Earnhardt  winning five of them.

In 1953, NASCAR's Grand National Series (later the Cup Series) visited the track for the first time.  Tim Flock won the first race at the speedway, which became a regular part of the Grand National schedule.  After winning his track championship in 1952, Junior Johnson became the most successful Grand National driver at Hickory, winning there seven times.

The track has been re-configured three times in its history.  The track became a 0.4-mile (644 meters) dirt track in 1955, which was paved for the first time during the 1967 season.

Race report
Two hundred and fifty-two laps were accomplished on a dirt track spanning . The race took one hour and twenty-eight minutes to complete (the approximate length of three modern 30-minute sitcoms aired simultaneously). Jack Smith would become the eventual second-place finished after being outlapped by White in front of 10500 live spectators. Two cautions slowed the race for an undetermined length of laps. Junior Johnson would crash on lap 58 in his 1961 Pontiac Catalina machine while the winning vehicle would be classified as a Chevrolet with a 1961 model year (presumably a Bel Air). Being a modest race on a short dirt track, the highest prize that was awarded at the time was $900 ($ in current U.S. dollars).

A young Richard Petty (being only 24 years old during this race) would finish in 17th place due to issues with his vehicle's rear end on lap 102.; it would be a rare occasion where he drove a car other than his signature number 43. The entire 20-car field was made up of American-born males. Bud Allman was Ned Jarrett's crew chief for the race; he helped Jarrett finish in eighth place.

The transition to purpose-built racecars began in the early 1960s and occurred gradually over that decade.  Changes made to the sport by the late 1960s brought an end to the "strictly stock" vehicles of the 1950s.

Qualifying

Top 10 finishers

Timeline
Section reference: 
 Start of race: Rex White started the race with the pole position, who was prompted overtaken by Junior Johnson prior to lap 2.
 Lap 58: Junior Johnson had a terminal crash, forcing him to withdraw from the event.
 Lap 59: Rex White took the lead from Junior Johnson.
 Lap 61: The clutch in Doug Yates' vehicle became problematic, ending his day on the track.
 Lap 89: The rear end of Larry Thomas' vehicle was disabled, ending the race early for him.
 Lap 102: Richard Petty's vehicle would be missing a rear end, prompting him to leave the race early.
 Lap 162: The rear end of Bob Barron's vehicle fell out, forcing him to leave the race prematurely.
 Lap 189: Joe Weatherly noticed that the ball joints on his vehicle came out, forcing him to end his race session early.
 Lap 190: Rex White took over the lead from Ned Jarrett.
 Lap 194: The left-rear axle that belonged to Jimmy Pardue's vehicle stopped working properly on this lap.
 Lap 209: Ned Jarrett took over the lead from Rex White.
 Lap 239: The left-rear axle of Ned Jarrett's vehicle developed major issues, forcing him to accept a respectable eighth-place finish.
 Lap 240: Rex White took over the lead from Ned Jarrett for the final 11 laps of the event.
 Finish: Rex White was officially declared the winner of the event.

References

Buddy Shuman 250
Buddy Shuman 250
NASCAR races at Hickory Motor Speedway